Disowned (Italian: Ripudiata) is a 1955 Italian historical melodrama film directed by Giorgio Walter Chili and starring Alberto Farnese, Hélène Rémy and Laura Nucci.

Cast
 Alberto Farnese as barone Giulio Colizzi 
 Hélène Rémy as contessina Bianca Maria Sulliotti 
 Laura Nucci as Laura Elisa, sorella di Giulio 
 John Douglas as Franz Von Klaus 
 Vittorio Duse as Filippo 
 Augusto Pennella as piccolo Guglielmo 
 Amedeo Trilli as padre di Bianca Maria 
 Gianni Rizzo
 Renato Malavasi
 Emma Baron
 Giulio Donnini
 Cesare Fantoni
 Oscar Andriani
 Memmo Carotenuto
 Augusto Di Giovanni
 Girolamo Favara
 Pietro Fumelli
 Loris Gizzi
 Lia Lena
 Virna Lisi
 Paolo Pacetti
 Giovanni Petrucci
 Diego Pozzetto
 Paolo Reale
 Ugo Sasso
 Eugenio Valenti
 Henri Vidon

References

Bibliography 
 Chiti, Roberto & Poppi, Roberto. Dizionario del cinema italiano: Dal 1945 al 1959. Gremese Editore, 1991.

External links 
 
 Disowned at Variety Distribution

1955 films
Italian historical drama films
1950s historical drama films
1950s Italian-language films
Films directed by Giorgio Walter Chili
Films set in the 1840s
1955 drama films
Melodrama films
Italian black-and-white films
1950s Italian films